Kane Township is a civil township in Bottineau County in the U.S. state of North Dakota. As of the 2010 census, its population was 57.

References

Townships in Bottineau County, North Dakota
Townships in North Dakota